= Naanam Moonam =

Naanam Moonam was a language used in the middle part of Travancore, in Kerala. It was in use among the communities for centuries. It was assumed to be originated from Sanskrit and Tamil. It had its own letters. One of the ancient churches in this part of Kerala is St George's Church Aruvithura. There are many inscriptions in this church which are written in Naanam Moonam. It is believed to be completely extinct since the end of the 18th century. An old version of Malayalam became more popular by then.

The language is also known as Nanam Monam.
